The nominees for the 2010 Ovation Awards were announced on October 18, 2010, at the Autry National Center in Los Angeles, California.  The awards were presented for excellence in stage productions in the Los Angeles area from September, 2009 to August, 2010 based upon evaluations from 250 members of the Los Angeles theater community.

The winners were announced on January 17, 2011, in a ceremony at the Thousand Oaks Civic Arts Plaza in Thousand Oaks, California.

Awards 
Winners are listed first and highlighted in boldface.

{| class=wikitable
|-
! style="background:#EEDD82; width:50%" | Best Production of a Musical (Intimate Theater)
! style="background:#EEDD82; width:50%" | Best Production of a Musical (Large Theater)
|-
| valign="top" |
 The Women of Brewster Place – Celebration Theatre
 Project Wonderland – Bootleg Theater
 The Story of My Life – Havok Theatre Company
 The Who's Tommy – The Chance Theater
 Sweeney Todd – The Production Company
| valign="top" |
 Oedipus the King, Mama! – Troubadour Theater Company
 Carousel – Reprise Theatre Company
 Daddy Long Legs – Rubicon Theatre Company
 The Marvelous Wonderettes – Musical Theatre West
 Parade – Center Theatre Group: Mark Taper Forum
|-
! style="background:#EEDD82; width:50%" | Best Production of a Play (Intimate Theater) – 2 winners
! style="background:#EEDD82; width:50%" | Best Production of a Play (Large Theater)
|-
| valign="top" |
 The Ballad of Emmett Till – Fountain Theatre
 Four Places – Rogue Machine Theatre
 Cousin Bette – The Antaeus Company
 Oedipus el Rey – The Theatre @ Boston Court
 Opus – Fountain Theatre
 Shaheed -- The Dream and Death of Benazir Bhutto – Stephanie Feury Studio Theatre
 Something Happened – Pacific Stages
| valign="top" |
 Equivocation – Geffen Playhouse
 Awake and Sing! – A Noise Within
 Doubt – Rubicon Theatre Company
 Grace & Glorie – The Colony Theatre Company
 Through the Night – Geffen Playhouse
|-
! style="background:#EEDD82" | Lead Actor in a Musical – 3 winners
! style="background:#EEDD82" | Lead Actress in a Musical
|-
| valign="top" |
 Josh Grisetti as J. Pierrepont Finch – How to Succeed in Business Without Really Trying – Reprise Theatre Company
 Brendan Hunt as Eldridge – Savin’ Up for Saturday Night – Sacred Fools Theater Company
 Robert J. Townsend as Thomas Weaver – The Story of My Life – Havok Theatre Company
 T. R. Knight as Leo Frank – Parade – Center Theatre Group: Mark Taper Forum
 Chad Borden as Alvin Kelby – The Story of My Life – Havok Theatre Company
 Norman Large as Sweeney Todd – Sweeney Todd – Musical Theatre West
 Kurt Andrew Hanson as Sweeney Todd – Sweeney Todd – The Production Company
| valign="top" |
 Megan McGinnis as Jerusha – Daddy Long Legs – Rubicon Theatre Company
 Alexandra Silber as Julie Jordan – Carousel – Reprise Theatre Company
 Teri Bibb as Ellen Terry – Children of the Night – Katselas Theatre Company
 Lara Pulver as Lucille Frank – Parade – Center Theatre Group: Mark Taper Forum
 Debbie Prutsman as Mrs. Lovett – Sweeney Todd – Musical Theatre West
|-
! style="background:#EEDD82" | Lead Actor in a Play – 3 winners
! style="background:#EEDD82" | Lead Actress in a Play – 2 winners
|-
| valign="top" |
 Bruce French as Andrew Crocker-Harris – The Browning Version – Pacific Resident Theatre
 Alan Mandell as Spooner – No Man's Land – Odyssey Theatre Ensemble
 Daniel Beaty – Through the Night – Geffen Playhouse
 Dakin Matthews as King Lear – King Lear – The Antaeus Company
 Justin Huen as Oedipus – Oedipus el Rey – The Theatre @ Boston Court
 Will Bradley as Brown – The Twentieth-Century Way – The Theatre @ Boston Court
 Robert Mammana as Warren – The Twentieth-Century Way – The Theatre @ Boston Court
| valign="top" |
 Beth Grant as Grace – Grace & Glorie – The Colony Theatre Company
 Anna Khaja – Shaheed -- The Dream and Death of Benazir Bhutto – Stephanie Feury Studio Theatre
 Robin Pearson Rose as Sister Aloysius – Doubt – Rubicon Theatre Company
 Anne Gee Byrd as Peggy – Four Places – Rogue Machine Theatre
 Roxanne Hart as Ellen – Four Places – Rogue Machine Theatre
 Agatha Nowicki as Susie – Parasite Drag – Elephant Theatre Company
 Eve Sigall as A – Three Tall Women – West Coast Ensemble
|-
! style="background:#EEDD82" | Featured Actor in a Musical
! style="background:#EEDD82" | Featured Actress in a Musical
|-
| valign="top" |
 David St. Louis as Newt Lee/Jim Conley/Riley – Parade – Center Theatre Group: Mark Taper Forum
 Andy Taylor as Enoch Snow – Carousel – Reprise Theatre Company
 Sam Zeller as Jud Fry – Oklahoma! – Civic Light Opera of South Bay Cities
 Michael Berresse as Governor Slaton/Britt Craig/Mr. Peavy – Parade – Center Theatre Group: Mark Taper Forum
 Dan Callaway as Anthony Hope – Sweeney Todd – Musical Theatre West
 Rob Herring as Tobias – Sweeney Todd – The Production Company
 R. Christofer Sands as Pirelli/Fogg – Sweeney Todd – The Production Company
| valign="top" |
 Sally Struthers as Fairy Godmother – Cinderella – Cabrillo Music Theatre
 Jane Noseworthy as Carrie Pipperidge – Carousel – Reprise Theatre Company
 Vicki Lewis as Smitty – How to Succeed in Business Without Really Trying – Reprise Theatre Company
 Deidrie Henry as Minnie McKnight – Parade – Center Theatre Group: Mark Taper Forum
 Sarah Bermudez as Johanna – Sweeney Todd – Musical Theatre West
 Michelle Duffy as Beggar Woman – Sweeney Todd – Musical Theatre West
 Jenny Ashman as Johanna – Sweeney Todd – The Production Company
|-
! style="background:#EEDD82" | Featured Actor in a Play
! style="background:#EEDD82" | Featured Actress in a Play
|-
| valign="top" |
 Harry Groener as Richard – Equivocation – Geffen Playhouse John Prosky as Hector Hulot – Cousin Bette – The Antaeus Company
 Patrick J. Adams as Sharpe – Equivocation – Geffen Playhouse
 Brian Henderson as Armin – Equivocation – Geffen Playhouse
 Connor Trinneer as Nate – Equivocation – Geffen Playhouse
 Morlan Higgins as Sam – Forgiveness – Black Dahlia Theatre
 Matthew Scott Montgomery as Kendall Parker – Yellow – Jd3atrical
| valign="top" |
 Deirdre O’Connell as Judy – The Wake – Center Theatre Group: Kirk Douglas Theatre Jan Sheldrick as Etta Poore – Anita Bryant Died for Your Sins – West Coast Ensemble
 Amanda Detmer as Missy – Extinction – Red Dog Squadron
 Lee Garlington as Penny – Forgiveness – Black Dahlia Theatre
 Lisa Rothschiller as Barb – Four Places – Rogue Machine Theatre
 Danielle Skraastad as Laurie – The Wake – Center Theatre Group: Kirk Douglas Theatre
 Susan Leslie as Timothea Parker – Yellow – Jd3atrical
|-
! style="background:#EEDD82" | Acting Ensemble
! style="background:#EEDD82" | Best Season
|-
| valign="top" |
 The cast of The Ballad of Emmett Till – Fountain Theatre The cast of The 25th Annual Putnam County Spelling Bee – La Mirada Theatre for The Performing Arts
 The cast of The Marvelous Wonderettes – Musical Theatre West
 The cast of Oedipus el Rey – The Theatre @ Boston Court
 The cast of Opus – Fountain Theatre
 The cast of Something Happened – Pacific Stages
 The cast of The Women of Brewster Place – Celebration Theatre
| valign="top" |
 Fountain Theatre Cabrillo Music Theatre
 Reprise Theatre Company
 The Los Angeles Theatre Center (LATC)
 The Production Company
 The Theatre @ Boston Court
 Troubadour Theater Company
|-
! style="background:#EEDD82" | Director of a Musical
! style="background:#EEDD82" | Director of a Play
|-
| valign="top" |
 Matt Walker – Oedipus the King, Mama! – Troubadour Theater Company Nick Degruccio – The Andrews Brothers – Cabrillo Music Theatre
 Michael Michetti – Carousel – Reprise Theatre Company
 John Caird – Daddy Long Legs – Rubicon Theatre Company
 Robert Ashford – Parade – Center Theatre Group: Mark Taper Forum
 Oanh Nguyen – The Who's Tommy – The Chance Theater
 Michael Matthews – The Women of Brewster Place – Celebration Theatre
| valign="top" |
 Shirley Jo Finney – The Ballad of Emmett Till – Fountain Theatre David Esbjornson – Equivocation – Geffen Playhouse
 Robin Larsen – Four Places – Rogue Machine Theatre
 Jon Lawrence Rivera – Oedipus el Rey – The Theatre @ Boston Court
 L Trey Wilson – Something Happened – Pacific Stages
 Charles Randolph-Wright – Through the Night – Geffen Playhouse
 Michael Michetti – The Twentieth-Century Way – The Theatre @ Boston Court
|-
! style="background:#EEDD82" | Music Direction
! style="background:#EEDD82" | Choreography
|-
| valign="top" |
 John Glaudini – Sweeney Todd – Musical Theatre West Lloyd Cooper – The Andrews Brothers – Cabrillo Music Theatre
 Michael Borth – The Marvelous Wonderettes – Musical Theatre West
 Tom Murray – Parade – Center Theatre Group: Mark Taper Forum
 David O – Songs and Dances of Imaginary Lands – Overtone Industries
 Michael Paternostro – The Story of My Life – Havok Theatre Company
 Richard Berent – Sweeney Todd – The Production Company
| valign="top" |
 Lee Martino – Carousel – Reprise Theatre Company Roger Castellano – The Andrews Brothers – Cabrillo Music Theatre
 Ameenah Kaplan – The Ballad of Emmett Till – Fountain Theatre
 Janet Miller – The Marvelous Wonderettes – Musical Theatre West
 Lili Fuller, Joe Sofranko, Matthew Krumpe & Juliana Tyson – Neverwonderland 2010 – Ensemble Theatre Company
 Robert Ashfordo – Parade – Center Theatre Group: Mark Taper Forum
 Ameenah Kaplan – The Women of Brewster Place – Celebration Theatre
|-
! style="background:#EEDD82" | Book for an Original Musical
! style="background:#EEDD82" | Lyrics/Music for an Original Musical
|-
| valign="top" |
 John Caird – Daddy Long Legs – Rubicon Theatre Company Scott Martin – Children of the Night – Katselas Theatre Company
 Rick Batalla – CHiPs The Musical – Troubadour Theater Company
 Dakin Matthews – Liberty Inn: The Musical – Andak Stage Company
 Robert Prior – Project Wonderland – Bootleg Theater
| valign="top" |
 Paul Gordon – Daddy Long Legs – Rubicon Theatre Company Henry Phillips – CHiPs The Musical – Troubadour Theater Company
 B.T. Ryback & Dakin Matthews – Liberty Inn: The Musical – Andak Stage Company
 Indira Stefanianna – Project Wonderland – Bootleg Theater
 Richard Levinson, Larry Herbstritt & Tom Campbell – Savin’ Up for Saturday Night – Sacred Fools Theater Company
|-
! style="background:#EEDD82" | Playwrighting For An Original Play
! style="background:#EEDD82" |
|-
| valign="top" |
 L. Trey Wilson – Something Happened – Pacific Stages Donald Freed – 1951-2006 – The Los Angeles Theatre Center (LATC)
 Jeffrey Hatcher – Cousin Bette – The Antaeus Company
 David Schulner – Forgiveness – Black Dahlia Theatre
 Luis Alfaro – Oedipus el Rey – The Theatre @ Boston Court
 Tom Jacobson – The Twentieth-Century Way – The Theatre @ Boston Court
 Del Shores – Yellow – Jd3atrical
| valign="top" |
|-
! style="background:#EEDD82" | Lighting Design (Intimate Theater)
! style="background:#EEDD82" | Lighting Design (Large Theater)
|-
| valign="top" |
 Jeremy Pivnick – Oedipus el Rey – The Theatre @ Boston Court Leigh Allen – Cousin Bette – The Antaeus Company
 Steven Young – God Save Gertrude – The Theatre @ Boston Court
 Brian Sidney Bembridge – The Good Book of Pedantry and Wonder – The Theatre @ Boston Court
 Elizabeth Harper – The Twentieth-Century Way – The Theatre @ Boston Court
 KC Wilkerson – Welcome Home, Jenny Sutter – The Chance Theater
 KC Wilkerson – The Who's Tommy – The Chance Theater
| valign="top" |
 Scott Zielinski – Equivocation – Geffen Playhouse Christopher Ash – 1951-2006 – The Los Angeles Theatre Center (LATC)
 Steven Young – Carousel – Reprise Theatre Company
 Mason Barker – Neverwonderland 2010 – Ensemble Theatre Company
 Neil Austin – Parade – Center Theatre Group: Mark Taper Forum
 Jeff Croiter – The Pee-Wee Herman Show – AEG Live
 Alexander Nichols – Through the Night – Geffen Playhouse
|-
! style="background:#EEDD82" | Scenic Design (Intimate Theater)
! style="background:#EEDD82" | Scenic Design (Large Theater)
|-
| valign="top" |
 Brian Sidney Bembridge – The Good Book of Pedantry and Wonder – The Theatre @ Boston Court Desma Murphy – As White as O – Road Theatre Company
 Jeff G. Rack – Black Coffee – Theatre 40
 Tom Buderwitz – Cousin Bette – The Antaeus Company
 Susan Gratch – God Save Gertrude – The Theatre @ Boston Court
 Katie Polebaum – Gogol Project – Bootleg Theater
 John Binkley – Oedipus el Rey – The Theatre @ Boston Court
| valign="top" |
 Jeff McLaughlin – Grace & Glorie – The Colony Theatre Company John Iacovelli – Cave Quest – East West Players
 Stephen Gifford – Celadine – The Colony Theatre Company
 David Farley – Daddy Long Legs – Rubicon Theatre Company
 David Korins – The Pee-Wee Herman Show – AEG Live
 Snezana Petrovic – Songs and Dances of Imaginary Lands – Overtone Industries
 David Korins – The Wake – Center Theatre Group: Kirk Douglas Theatre
|-
! style="background:#EEDD82" | Sound Design (Intimate Theater)
! style="background:#EEDD82" | Sound Design (Large Theater)
|-
| valign="top" |
 Peter Bayne – Opus – Fountain Theatre John Zalewski – Absinthe, Opium & Magic: 1920s Shanghai – Grand Guignolers
 David B. Marling – The Ballad of Emmett Till – Fountain Theatre
 Jason Duplissea – Blood and Thunder – Moving Arts
 Cricket S. Myers – Cousin Bette – The Antaeus Company
 Mark Wilson – Neighborhood 3 : Requisition of Doom – Sacred Fools Theater Company
 Rob Oriol – Oedipus el Rey – The Theatre @ Boston Court
| valign="top" |
 Lindsay Jones – Through the Night – Geffen Playhouse Jonathan Burke – Daddy Long Legs – Rubicon Theatre Company
 Jon Gottlieb – Equivocation – Geffen Playhouse
 Cricket S. Myers – Grace & Glorie – The Colony Theatre Company
 Cricket S. Myers – The Lieutenant of Inishmore – Center Theatre Group: Mark Taper Forum
 Jon Weston – Parade – Center Theatre Group: Mark Taper Forum
 John Zalewski – Solitude – The Los Angeles Theatre Center (LATC)
|-
! style="background:#EEDD82" | Costume Design (Intimate Theater)
! style="background:#EEDD82" | Costume Design (Large Theater) – 2 winners
|-
| valign="top" |
 Teresa Shea – Project Wonderland – Bootleg Theater Vicki Conrad – Big River: The Adventures of Huckleberry Finn – Actors Co-Op/Crossley Theatre
 Joyce Ferrer – Black Coffee – Theatre 40
 A. Jeffrey Schoenberg – Children of the Night – Katselas Theatre Company
 A. Jeffrey Schoenberg – Cousin Bette – The Antaeus Company
 Kerry Hennessy – Gogol Project – Bootleg Theater
 Erika C. Miller – The Who's Tommy – The Chance Theater
| valign="top" |
 Christopher Oram – Parade – Center Theatre Group: Mark Taper Forum Snezana Petrovic – Songs and Dances of Imaginary Lands – Overtone Industries Julie Keen – Awake and Sing! – A Noise Within
 A. Jeffrey Schoenberg – Celadine – The Colony Theatre Company
 Sharon Mcgunigle – Frosty The Snow Manilow – Troubadour Theater Company
 Shigeru Yaji – Peace – The J. Paul Getty Trust
 Ann Closs-Farley – The Pee-Wee Herman Show – AEG Live
|}

 Ovation Honors 
Ovation Honors, which recognize outstanding achievement in areas that are not among the standard list of nomination categories, were presented when the nominations were announced.
 Music Composition for a Play – Ego Plum – Gogol Project – Bootleg Theater
 Fight Choreography – Edgar Landa – Oedipus el Rey – The Theatre @ Boston Court
 Puppet Design – Lynn Jeffries – Project Wonderland – Bootleg Theater
 Video Design' – K.C. Wilkerson – The Who's Tommy'' – The Chance Theater

References 

Ovation Awards
Ovation
2011 in California
Ovation